Charles Delporte may refer to:

 Charles Delporte (fencer) (1893–1960), Belgian fencer and Olympic champion
 Charles Delporte (artist) (1928–2012), Belgian painter and sculptor
 Charles Delporte (wrestler) (1914–1940), French Olympic wrestler